
Xinjian may refer to these places in China:

Xinjian District, a suburban district of Nanchang, Jiangxi

Towns
Xinjian, Guizhou, in Fenggang County, Guizhou
Xinjian, Hunan, in Zhongfang County, Hunan
Xinjian, Jiangsu, in Yixing, Jiangsu
Xinjian, Zhejiang, in Jinyun County, Zhejiang

Townships
Xinjian Township, Ningnan County, in Ningnan County, Sichuan
Xinjian Township, Yingjing County, in Yingjing County, Sichuan

Subdistricts
Xinjian Subdistrict, Qiqihar, in Ang'angxi District, Qiqihar, Heilongjiang
Xinjian Subdistrict, Baishan, in Hunjiang District, Baishan, Jilin
Xinjian Subdistrict, Jilin City, in Changyi District, Jilin City, Jilin
Xinjian Subdistrict, Yingkou, in Zhanqian District, Yingkou, Liaoning
Xinjian Subdistrict, Jinzhong, in Yuci District, Jinzhong, Shanxi
Xinjian Subdistrict, Nanchong, in Shunqing District, Nanchong, Sichuan

See also
Xinjiang, an autonomous region of China
Xinjiang (disambiguation)